The C&C 45, also known as the IMS 45, is an American sailboat, that was designed by William Tripp III and first built in 2000.

Production
The design was built by C&C Yachts in the United States, but it is now out of production.

Design
The C&C 45 is a recreational keelboat, built predominantly of fiberglass. It has a fractional sloop rig, a nearly plumb stem, a reverse transom, an internally-mounted spade-type rudder controlled by a wheel and a fixed fin keel. It displaces  and carries  of ballast.

See also
List of sailing boat types

Similar sailboats
Hunter 45
Hunter 45 DS
Hunter 456
Hunter Passage 450

References

Keelboats
2000s sailboat type designs
Sailing yachts
Sailboat type designs by William Tripp III
Sailboat types built by C&C Yachts